South Korea (IOC designation:Korea) participated in the 1996 Asian Winter Games held in Harbin, China PR from February 4, 1996 to February 11, 1996.

Medal summary

Medal table

Medalists

Gold
Alpine skiing
 Men's Super Giant Slalom - Byun Jong-moon

Short track speed skating
 Men's 1000 m - Chae Ji-hoon
 Men's 3000 m - Chae Ji-hoon
 Men's 5000 m Relay - Chae Ji-hoon, Lee Jun-hwan, Kim Dong-sung, Kim Seon-tae
 Women's 1000 m - Chun Lee-kyung
 Women's 3000 m - Kim Yoon-mi

Speed skating
 Men's 500 m - Jaegal Sung-yeol
 Women's 1000 m - Chun Hee-joo

Silver
Alpine skiing
 Men's Giant Slalom - Hur Seung-Wook

Short track speed skating
 Men's 500 m - Kim Dong-sung
 Men's 1000 m - Song Jae-kun
 Men's 1500 m - Chae Ji-hoon
 Men's 3000 m - Kim Dong-sung
 Women's 1000 m - Won Hye-kyung
 Women's 1500 m - Chun Lee-kyung
 Women's 3000 m - Won Hye-kyung
 Women's 3000 m Relay - Kim Yoon-mi, Won Hye-kyung, Kim So-hee, An Sang-mi

Speed skating
 Men's 1000 m - Kim Yoon-man

Bronze
Alpine skiing
 Men's Giant Slalom - Byun Jong-moon

Cross-country skiing
 Men's 10 km (Classical) - Park Byung-chul

Short track speed skating
 Men's 1000 m - Kim Dong-sung
 Men's 1500 m - Lee Jun-hwan
 Men's 3000 m - Song Jae-kun
 Women's 1500 m - Kim Yoon-mi
 Women's 3000 m - Chun Lee-kyung

Speed skating
 Men's 500 m - Kim Yoon-man

References

Nations at the 1996 Asian Winter Games
Asian Winter Games
South Korea at the Asian Winter Games